Dady Aristide (born 6 June 1970) is a Turks and Caicos Islands footballer.

International career
By virtue of playing in an 8–0 defeat to Guyana in October 2018, Aristide became the fifth oldest male international footballer of all time. He was 48 years and 129 days old.

Career statistics

International

Notes
1.Aristide is listed as the seventh oldest player on the RSSSF website. However, Barrie Dewsbury at number 1 and Keith Yon at number 3 represented Sark and St Helena, respectfully, and are not counted as full internationals.

References

1970 births
Living people
Association football forwards
Turks and Caicos Islands footballers
Turks and Caicos Islands international footballers